was a Japanese daimyō of the late Sengoku period through early Edo period. He was born in Tōtōmi Province, the eldest son of Miyake Yasusada. Together with his father, Yasunobu served Tokugawa Ieyasu, fighting in many of the Tokugawa clan's major campaigns. During the Battle of Sekigahara (1600), Yasunobu served as castle warden of Yokosuka Castle, and was granted wardenship of Kameyama Castle after the campaign. In 1614, during the first Sieges of Osaka, he defended Sunpu Castle in Suruga Province; during the following year, he supervised the defense of Yodo Castle. After his father's death the same year, he succeeded to family headship, and received his father's domain of Koromo. His income was raised by 2,000 koku in 1620, when he received the Ise-Kameyama Domain (12,000 koku).

Yasunobu died in 1632 in Kameyama, at age 70. His eldest son Yasumori succeeded him.

References
 Kameyama timeline on Kameyamarekihaku.jp (19 February 2008)
 "Miyake Yasunobu" on the Japanese Wikipedia (19 February 2008)

|-

Daimyo
1563 births
1632 deaths